Tigers FC or Tiger FC is the name of several association football clubs:

 Tigers FC, the National Premier Leagues Capital Football team representing Cooma FC
 Tigers FC (Cayman Islands), a club playing in the Cayman Islands league
 Tigers FC (Malawi), a club playing in the Malawi Premier Division
 Tiger FC (South Sudan), a club playing in the South Sudan Football Championship